Brena or Breña is a surname. Notable people with the surname include:

Guido Breña López (1931–2013), Peruvian Roman Catholic bishop
Kelly Brena, Martiniquais football player
Lepa Brena (born 1960), Yugoslav and Serbian singer and actress

See also 

 Brena (disambiguation)
 Brenta (surname)